The tanga was a unit of currency in Tajikistan between 10 May 1995 and 29 October 2000 and was worth one hundredth of a Tajik rouble. No coins or banknotes were ever issued denominated in tanga.

In January 1997 the exchange rate was 350 Tajik roubles per US dollar, making one tanga worth just under 0.003 US cents.

References

Modern obsolete currencies
Economic history of Tajikistan
1995 establishments in Tajikistan
2000 disestablishments in Tajikistan
1990s economic history